Nendeln is a village of Liechtenstein, located in the municipality of Eschen.

History
Prior to the establishment of the village, the Roman Empire had a presence here.  Villas from that time period have been excavated at Nendeln.

Geography
The village is located in north-central Liechtenstein, on the main road Schaan-Schaanwald that links the country with Buchs (Switzerland) and Feldkirch (Austria). Closer villages to Nendeln are Schaanwald, Mauren, Eschen and Planken.

Transport
Nendeln has a railway station on the Feldkirch-Buchs line. The station is served by eighteen trains per day, nine in each direction between Switzerland and Austria. When the next station in the direction of Austria (Schaanwald) is not used, which has been the case since 2013, Nendeln is for customs purposes, a border station for passengers arriving from Austria. Liechtenstein is in a customs union with Switzerland. Customs checks may be performed in the station or on board trains by Swiss officials. Systematic passport controls were abolished when Liechtenstein joined the Schengen Area in 2011.

References

External links

Villages of Liechtenstein